Karbala is a 2015 Polish war drama film based on real events directed by filmmaker Krzysztof Łukaszewicz and set during the 2003 invasion of Iraq. It portrays the defense of the Karbala City Hall by the Polish and Bulgarian stabilization forces during the Shia rebellion in 2004. The film had its premiere on 11 September 2015.

Cast 
 Bartłomiej Topa – Kalicki
 Antoni Królikowski – Kamil Grad
 Hristo Shopov – Getow
 Mikołaj Roznerski – Różdżyński "Rożen"
 Atheer Adel – Fraid
 Leszek Lichota – Malenczuk "Maly"
 Michał Żurawski – Waszczuk "Starszy"
 Tomasz Schuchardt – Sobanski
 Zbigniew Stryj -–Dabek
  – Waszczuk "Mlody"
 Łukasz Simlat – "X"
 Fatima Yazdani – Córka Farida

See also 
 Grzegorz Kaliciak (officer)
 Defense of the Karbala City Hall

References

External links 

Polish war drama films
Siege films
Iraq War films
War films based on actual events
Films set in Iraq
2015 war drama films
2015 drama films
2015 films